is a Japanese football player who currently plays for Matsumoto Yamaga.

Club statistics
Updated to 24 February 2019.

References

External links
Profile at Matsumoto Yamaga 

1989 births
Living people
Association football people from Tokyo
Japanese footballers
J1 League players
J2 League players
Yokohama F. Marinos players
Sagan Tosu players
Ehime FC players
Matsumoto Yamaga FC players
Association football defenders